Micropterix zangheriella is a species of moth belonging to the family Micropterigidae. It was described by John Heath in 1963. It is only known from the northern Apennines and has been found only in the Emilia-Romagna so far.

The habitat consists of clearings and edges of beech- and mixed beech-forests with well structured underwoods.

The length of the forewings is 3,85 mm for males and 4,3–5 mm for females.

References

Micropterigidae
Moths described in 1963
Endemic fauna of Italy
Moths of Europe
Taxa named by John Heath